The Red River Gorge is a canyon system on the Red River in east-central Kentucky. Geologically it is part of the Pottsville Escarpment.

It was designated a National Natural Landmark and National Archaeological District, and listed on the National Register of Historic Places. The  Clifty Wilderness Area lies entirely within the geological area in the Red River Gorge.

This intricate canyon system features an abundance of high sandstone cliffs, rock shelters, waterfalls, and natural bridges. There are more than 100 natural sandstone arches in the Red River Gorge Geological Area. The multitude of sandstone and cliff-lines helped this area become one of the world's top rock climbing destinations and is home to the Red River Gorge Climbers' Coalition. The area is nicknamed the Red by climbers.

Kentucky's Natural Bridge State Park is immediately adjacent to this area, featuring one of the largest natural bridges in the Red River Gorge.

The section of the Red River in the upper gorge is also a legally designated Kentucky Wild River by the Kentucky General Assembly through the Office of Kentucky Nature Preserves' Wild Rivers Program.

Because of its unusual and rugged nature, the Red River Gorge features a remarkable variety of ecological zones.

History

Nada Tunnel

Rock and dirt were removed by dynamite, steam drills, and hand tools. One man was killed during tunnel construction when he attempted to thaw frozen dynamite which exploded when he set it near a fire.

The tunnel has often been described as the "Gateway to Red River Gorge" for the shortcut it provides motorists.

History of the proposed Red River Gorge Dam
The Red River's tendency to flood offered downstream residents much misery. In 1962 the "Great Flood of Clay City," the worst seen in 102 years, moved both government officials and local communities to lobby the Kentucky State Legislature and the Kennedy administration for immediate construction of a flood control dam. The United States Congress ultimately approved the measure and provided funding. The Army Corps of Engineers set about their business of making the structure a reality; however, many felt that such actions would destroy the unique ecosystem residing in the dam inundation area. The Sierra Club spearheaded the formation of a group opposed to the construction of the dam. This group obtained the help of Supreme Court Justice William O. Douglas by participating in a Dam Protest Hike which drew local and national attention to the situation. The Dam Protest Hike took place on November 18, 1967 at the Clifty Wilderness area junction of Swift Camp Creek and the Red River, Highway 715.

In 1971, the University of Kentucky commissioned Wendell Berry, a Kentucky native farmer and author to write a book called The Unforeseen Wilderness advocating the preservation of the gorge in its natural state.

The struggle of wills lasted several decades, involved two proposed dam sites and finally concluded with Red River's entry into the National Wild and Scenic River system on December 3, 1993 when President Bill Clinton signed "H.R.914 - Red River Designation Act of 1993," into law. The bill was sponsored by U.S. Representative Hal Rogers and provides federal protection for a  section of the river. This legislation precluded the construction of any dam on the Red River and helps to preserve the Gorge as it exists today.

Motion pictures
The Red River Gorge's Sky Bridge appears in the 1955 film The Kentuckian, starring and directed by Burt Lancaster. It was also the first major motion picture filmed in Kentucky.

Biology and ecology
The Red River Gorge Geological Area, including Clifty Wilderness, has a very diverse biology. The Gorge is home to a great variety of wildlife including hawks, owls, woodpeckers, hummingbirds, deer, fox, black bears, and two venomous snakes: the copperhead and the timber rattlesnake. It is also home to several endangered species including the white-haired goldenrod which is found only in Red River Gorge.  Experts believe that plants of Canadian origin were established in the Red River Gorge area during the Pliocene-Quaternary glaciation which started about 2.58 million years ago.  These plants grow in the gorge's sheltered canyons and include diverse species such as purple fringed orchid Platanthera psycodes, Canadian lily Lilium canadense, and Canadian yew Taxus canadensis.

Archaeology
Rock shelters and other sites in the Red River Gorge Geological Area contain artifacts of prehistoric occupancy by indigenous people, beginning with the Paleoindian period. Rock shelters are particularly valuable as archeological sites because they are protected from weathering related to precipitation. Plant materials and other relics, such as woven mats and leather moccasins that would decompose in more typical sites are well-preserved in the dry, nitrate-rich soils found in rock shelters. Sites in the area yielded some of the earliest evidence of the domestication of plants found in the eastern United States.

The Red River Gorge, Clifty Wilderness, and the Indian Creek area were designated as a National Archaeological District and placed on the National Register of Historic Places in 2003. It contains 664 known prehistoric and historic sites that date from more than 11,000 years ago to the 20th century; 442 sites are contributing sites in the National Register district.

Clifty Wilderness
Clifty Wilderness is a  wilderness area contained entirely within the Red River Gorge Geological Area.

Recreation

Rock climbing
 

The Red River Gorge is a popular destination for rock climbers. The area has numerous cliffs in the gorge and in the surrounding areas. The vast number of bolted routes in overhanging, pocketed sandstone draws climbers from all over the world to "the Red" as it is known. Climbing in the region is often done at many separate small cliffs. There are numerous traditional and sport climbing routes in the region, although the latter is more dominant. Many cliffs lie within Daniel Boone National Forest; however several important cliffs are located on private land and in two privately owned preserves created to allow climbing access:
Pendergrass-Murray Recreational Preserve is a  preserve owned and maintained by Red River Gorge Climbers' Coalition.
Muir Valley is a  nature preserve and rock climbing area owned and maintained by Friends of Muir Valley thanks to a generous donation of land, labor, and resources from Rick and Liz Weber.

A number of climbing guidebooks have been published for the Red River Gorge. First was Red River Gorge Climber's Guide by Frank T Becker in 1975. The explosion of climbing activity since that seminal work led to a succession of other guidebooks, including Rawk! A Climber's Guide to the Red River Gorge by Ed Benjamin and Ed Pearsall, published in 1978, Red River Gorge Climbs by John H. Bronaugh, published in 1993, and Selected Climbs at Red River Gorge Kentucky by Porter Jarrard and Chris Snyder, published in 1997.  More recent published guidebooks include Ray Ellington's Red River Gorge Rock Climbs, published in 2005 with a second edition in 2007. The continued establishment of new routes required the latest edition to the guidebook to become two volumes, Red River Gorge Climbs South and Red River Gorge Climbs North. Ray Ellington's newest book, Miller Fork Climbing, explores hundreds of routes in the ever-growing Miller Fork Recreational Preserve.

Hiking and camping
The Red River Gorge is also known for its hiking trails that range in difficulty from beginner to advanced. Over 60 miles of trails, open only to hiking, are maintained by the Forest Service and are located throughout the park (some trails are designated for horses).

There are many campgrounds in the area. Primitive camping, also known as backpack camping, is permitted in the gorge if the camper(s) obtains an overnight permit. Camping is not permitted within 300 feet of any road or designated trail. No camping in rock shelters or within 100 feet of the base of any cliff.

One of the most popular destinations is Gray's Arch, one of the many natural arches in the park. Gray's Arch is accessible via the Gray's Arch Loop hiking trail (4.0 miles), hikers can scramble up the back side of the arch, although this activity is considered extremely dangerous and can lead to injury or death.

Gladie Visitor Center
The Daniel Boone National Forest Gladie Visitor Center is located in the Red River Gorge in Slade, Kentucky. The center features interpretive exhibits about the area's geology, natural history and cultural history. Visitors can get maps, information about trails, camping and other activities.

Gallery

References

External links

KY Wilderness
Powell County Tourism
Search & Rescue
The Red River Gorge Today
Red River Gorge at American Byways
Red River Gorge Climbers' Coalition
Red River Gorge Geologic Area
Red River Gorge at USDA Forest Service: Daniel Boone National Forest
Red Wild and Scenic River at National Wild and Scenic Rivers System
Volunteers Red River Gorge Trail Crew

Canyons and gorges of Kentucky
Climbing areas of the United States
Daniel Boone National Forest
Eastern Kentucky Coalfield
Geography of Appalachia
Landforms of Menifee County, Kentucky
Landforms of Powell County, Kentucky
Landforms of Wolfe County, Kentucky
National Natural Landmarks in Kentucky
Natural arches of Kentucky
Protected areas of Menifee County, Kentucky
Protected areas of Powell County, Kentucky
Protected areas of Wolfe County, Kentucky
National Register of Historic Places in Menifee County, Kentucky
Archaeological sites on the National Register of Historic Places in Kentucky
National Register of Historic Places in Wolfe County, Kentucky
National Register of Historic Places in Powell County, Kentucky
Historic districts on the National Register of Historic Places in Kentucky